Marcos Leonel Pérez (born 10 May 1993) is an Argentine footballer who plays as a midfielder for Deportivo Madryn.

Career
Pérez's career got started with Newell's Old Boys of the Argentine Primera División. He made his career debut on 6 November 2011 during a defeat to Unión Santa Fe. In total, Pérez made four appearances for Newell's Old Boys in his first three seasons. In June 2014, Pérez was loaned to Primera B Nacional's Gimnasia y Esgrima. He didn't feature throughout the 2016 campaign, but did score one goal in ten games during 2016–17. On 21 January 2016, Pérez joined Guillermo Brown on loan. He went on to play twenty-seven times for Guillermo Brown, including his debut on 24 April versus Crucero del Norte.

August 2017 saw Pérez leave Newell's Old Boys permanently to join Torneo Federal A side Sportivo Belgrano. His debut for the club arrived on 17 September in a 2–1 win against Gimnasia y Esgrima (CdU), prior to scoring his first goal in his seventeenth appearance on 25 February 2018 versus Chaco For Ever. On 22 July 2018, Pérez signed for Deportivo Madryn on loan.

Career statistics
.

References

External links

1993 births
Living people
Footballers from Rosario, Santa Fe
Argentine footballers
Association football midfielders
Argentine Primera División players
Primera Nacional players
Torneo Federal A players
Newell's Old Boys footballers
Gimnasia y Esgrima de Jujuy footballers
Guillermo Brown footballers
Sportivo Belgrano footballers
Deportivo Madryn players